Dan Stermer is an American rapper and podcaster known professionally as Big Dipper.

Early life and education 
Stermer was raised in Evanston, Illinois. His mother is Jewish, and his father is Christian. Stermer was raised in a Jewish household and attended Sunday school at a Reform synagogue. He first began performing at the age of 8 in a children's theater production of The Wizard of Oz. Stermer tried several instruments including, cello, piano, trumpet, tuba, and drums before deciding he enjoyed plays more. He began listening to hip hop and rap at the age of 9. He had a bar mitzvah in the eighth grade and was confirmed in 10th grade after taking more Jewish studies classes.

Stermer graduated from Ithaca College in 2007 where he studied theater.

Career 
Big Dipper wrote his first song at the age of 25. He began using the name Big Dipper at the age of 26. , he is based in Los Angeles. He has performed at bear festivals, P-town, and San Francisco Bear Pride. In 2019, he was a headliner  at Capital Pride. He stated one reason he performed was to combat hatred and help people feel empowered.

Big Dipper cohosted the podcast Unbearable with Meatball a bear drag queen. After a hiatus, they returned in June 2019 with a new podcast, Sloppy Seconds, on the Forever Dog network. On August 24, 2018, Big Dipper released his debut album Late Bloomer.

Artistry 
Big Dipper's work is often explicit and involves themes of sex and humor. He has been compared to fellow gay rapper Cazwell.

Personal life 
Big Dipper is gay and identifies as a member of the bear community.

Discography

Albums 

 Late Bloomer (2018)

Singles 

 "Drip Drop" (2011)
 "Summertime Realness"
 "LaCroix Boi"
 "Skank"
 "Dick in a Box"
 "Meat Quotient"
 "Cut Up"
 "Pressed"
 "That Nut"
 "Lookin"
 "Let's Talk about PrEP"

References

External links
 

Living people
Year of birth missing (living people)
Musicians from Evanston, Illinois
American gay musicians
LGBT rappers
LGBT people from Illinois
21st-century American rappers
American male rappers
Rappers from Illinois
American podcasters
Ithaca College alumni
LGBT Jews
Jewish rappers
Jewish American musicians
21st-century American male musicians
21st-century American LGBT people
21st-century American Jews